Cedar Branch is a  long 1st order tributary to Lanes Creek in Union County, North Carolina.

Course
Cedar Branch rises at Allens Crossroads, North Carolina.  Cedar Branch then flows southeast to meet Lanes Creek about 1.5 miles southeast of Allens Crossroads, North Carolina.

Watershed
Cedar Branch drains  of area, receives about 48.3 in/year of precipitation, has a topographic wetness index of 420.97 and is about 48% forested.

References

Rivers of North Carolina
Rivers of Union County, North Carolina
Tributaries of the Pee Dee River